John Marvin LeVoir (born February 7, 1946) is an American prelate of the Roman Catholic Church who served as bishop of the Diocese of New Ulm in Minnesota from 2008 until 2020.

Biography

Early years 
John LeVoir was born on February 7, 1946, to Marvin and Mary (b. 1915) LeVoir in Minneapolis, Minnesota. He has two brothers, Frederick and Paul, and a sister, Mary Ellen. John LeVoir studied at the University of St. Thomas, where he obtained a Bachelor of Science degree in chemistry in 1968.  He also attended the University of Minnesota, earning a Bachelor of Science degree in accounting in 1971.

From 1971 to 1976, Levoir worked as a Certified Public Accountant for various firms and also taught accounting at the University of Minnesota.  In 1974, he received a Bachelor of Arts degree in history from the university. In his late twenties, LeVoir decided to pursue an ecclesiastical career. He then entered the Saint Paul Seminary in St. Paul, Minnesota, earning a Master of Theology degree in 1981.

Priesthood 
On May 30, 1981, LeVoir was ordained to the priesthood for the Archdiocese of Saint Paul and Minneapolis by Archbishop John Roach at the Cathedral of St. Paul in St. Paul.

After his 1981 ordination, LeVoir was appointed associate pastor of St. Charles Borromeo Parish in St. Anthony, Minnesota. In 1992, he became pastor of Holy Trinity Parish in South St. Paul, Minnesota.  In 2000, LeVoir assumed the additional role of pastor of St. Augustine Parish in South St. Paul. He was transferred as pastor in 2004 to St. Michael Parish and St. Mary Parish, both in Stillwater, Minnesota.

Bishop of New Ulm
On July 14, 2008, Pope Benedict XVI appointed LeVoir as the fourth bishop of the Diocese of New Ulm. He was consecrated on September 15, 2008 by Archbishop John Nienstedt, with Bishops Frederick Campbell and Peter Christensen serving as co-consecrators.

On March 10, 2020, a $34 million settlement for 100 victims of sexual abuse victims by clergy in the Diocese was approved by a bankruptcy court.  During the proceedings, LeVoir apologized to the victims on behalf of the church.

Retirement 
On August 6, 2020, Pope Francis accepted LeVoir's resignation as bishop of New Ulm. Bishops normally resign on their 75th birthday, but LeVoir offered his earlier due to poor health. Monsignor Douglas L. Grams was appointed as the diocesan administrator of the diocese.

Publications 
LeVoir co-authored the book Covenant of Love: John Paul II on Sexuality, Marriage, and Family in the Modern World and Faith for Today.

See also

 Catholic Church hierarchy
 Catholic Church in the United States
 Historical list of the Catholic bishops of the United States
 List of Catholic bishops of the United States
 Lists of patriarchs, archbishops, and bishops

References

External links

1946 births
Living people
Roman Catholic bishops of New Ulm
21st-century Roman Catholic bishops in the United States
University of St. Thomas (Minnesota) alumni
Carlson School of Management alumni